Lake Henry is a lake in Douglas County, in the U.S. state of Minnesota.

Lake Henry was named for the son of a pioneer settler.

See also
List of lakes in Minnesota

References

Lakes of Minnesota
Lakes of Douglas County, Minnesota